Congregation Beth Israel is an Orthodox congregation located in Onset, Massachusetts, on Cape Cod. It is famous as the summer synagogue of Rabbi Joseph B. Soloveitchik and some of his students from the 1950s until the mid-1960s, when his wife died. The clapboard building was originally a furniture store, before it was converted to a synagogue in 1948.

Initially a destination for Jewish vacationers from Boston, Beth Israel now attracts Jews from Toronto, Montreal, and New York City from a "wide cross-section of Orthodoxy", including "Young Israel, Chabad, Chasidim from Montreal, Charedim, Carlebach Chasidim, very-left wing (Edah) and 'Conservadox'." The synagogue maintains three daily minyans throughout the summer and through the High Holidays.

Notes

External links
Congregation Beth Israel Official Website

Buildings and structures in Plymouth County, Massachusetts
Canadian-American culture in Massachusetts
Canadian-Jewish diaspora
Clapboard synagogues
Orthodox synagogues in Massachusetts